Delta Solar is a public artwork by Venezuelan sculptor Alejandro Otero  located outside of the National Air and Space Museum in Washington, DC, United States. Delta Solar is meant to pay homage to modern technology and the Inca sun cult.

Description

This abstract sculpture consists of stainless steel "sails" that move in the breeze. They are attached to an open geometric grid formed into the shape of a Delta Formation. It sits on concrete and in a reflecting pool.

Acquisition

The sculpture was dedicated on June 29, 1977 by Carlos Andrés Pérez, president of Venezuela as a gift celebrating the Bicentennial of the American Revolution. The sculpture was originally supposed to be dedicated in the Spring, however, cold weather prohibited the pouring of concrete for the base of the structure.

See also
 Ad Astra, Lippold sculpture
 Continuum sculpture
 List of public art in Washington, D.C., Ward 2

References

External links
 Alejandro Otero's Delta Solar from the Air and Space Museum

Sculptures of the Smithsonian Institution
1977 sculptures
Outdoor sculptures in Washington, D.C.
Steel sculptures in Washington, D.C.
Southwest Federal Center